Irlava Parish is an administrative unit of Tukums Municipality, in the Courland region of Latvia. Est. Population 1700 People.

Towns, villages and settlements of Irlava parish 
The biggest city in Irlava parish is Irlava but nearby village's also include Snapji and Sāti. 
The Abava river flows through Irlava. 
Irlava parish is covered in Forests and plains with some well known sites like: Peņku avots, Irlavas graveyard and the Spuņu rock.

References 

Parishes of Latvia
Tukums Municipality
Courland